Marc Bella (born 7 October 1961) is a French short track speed skater. He competed in two events at the 1992 Winter Olympics.

References

External links
 

1961 births
Living people
French male short track speed skaters
Olympic short track speed skaters of France
Short track speed skaters at the 1992 Winter Olympics
Sportspeople from Turin
Short track speed skaters at the 1988 Winter Olympics
20th-century French people